Andreas Wecker (born 2 January 1970 in Staßfurt) is a former German gymnast who had a long and successful career. He was European, World and Olympic champion. His greatest achievement was the gold medal on high bar at the 1996 Summer Olympics in Atlanta. There, he beat gymnasts of such quality as Vitaly Scherbo and Alexei Nemov. In 1989 Wecker was named the last East German Sportsman of the Year. He competed for the SC Dynamo Berlin / Sportvereinigung (SV) Dynamo.

Wecker qualified for the German team for the 2000 Sydney Olympics. Just days before his events, he suffered a serious shoulder injury where he tore a biceps muscle in his shoulder, ending his career. Today, Wecker is the chairman and founder of Andreas Seed Oils, headquartered in Bend, Oregon and distributed through his office in Germany.

References

 OlympiaStatistik

External links

 
 

1970 births
Living people
People from Staßfurt
German male artistic gymnasts
Gymnasts at the 1988 Summer Olympics
Gymnasts at the 1992 Summer Olympics
Gymnasts at the 1996 Summer Olympics
Gymnasts at the 2000 Summer Olympics
Olympic gymnasts of East Germany
Olympic gymnasts of Germany
Olympic gold medalists for Germany
Olympic silver medalists for East Germany
Olympic silver medalists for Germany
Olympic bronze medalists for Germany
World champion gymnasts
Medalists at the World Artistic Gymnastics Championships
Olympic medalists in gymnastics
Recipients of the Patriotic Order of Merit in silver
Medalists at the 1996 Summer Olympics
Medalists at the 1992 Summer Olympics
Medalists at the 1988 Summer Olympics
Sportspeople from Saxony-Anhalt